The Golden Spike Arena is a 6,500-seat multi-purpose arena in Ogden, Utah.  The arena hosts local concerts, trade shows and sporting events for the area.  The Golden Spike Arena was the home to the Ogden Knights of the American Indoor Football Association.

It is part of the Golden Spike Event Center sports and convention complex and includes  of arena floor space as well as six concession stands and open-span construction.  Other facilities include:
A 6,000-seat outdoor stadium
A A 2,500-seat race track.

All of the indoor venues can be used for conventions, trade shows and other events, while the outdoor stadium is used for rodeos, concerts, and other outdoor events.

External links
Official site

Indoor arenas in Utah
Convention centers in Utah
Sports venues in Ogden, Utah